Tafsir Chérif (born 19 June 1996) is a Guinean professional footballer who plays as a forward .

Chérif represented the Guinea U20s at the 2016 Toulon Tournament.

Career
On 31 August 2016, the last day of the 2016 summer transfer window, Chérif joined Rio Ave on loan from Monaco.

Career statistics

Club

References

External links

1996 births
Living people
Sportspeople from Conakry
Guinean footballers
Guinean expatriate footballers
2015 Africa Cup of Nations players
AS Monaco FC players
AJ Auxerre players
US Orléans players
Rio Ave F.C. players
Cercle Brugge K.S.V. players
SO Cholet players
Varzim S.C. players
Associação Académica de Coimbra – O.A.F. players
Al-Nojoom FC players
Ligue 2 players
Primeira Liga players
Challenger Pro League players
Championnat National players
Liga Portugal 2 players
Saudi First Division League players
Guinean expatriate sportspeople in France
Guinean expatriate sportspeople in Portugal
Guinean expatriate sportspeople in Belgium
Guinean expatriate sportspeople in Saudi Arabia
Expatriate footballers in France
Expatriate footballers in Portugal
Expatriate footballers in Belgium
Expatriate footballers in Saudi Arabia
Association football forwards